Danielli Pereira da Silva (born 21 January 1987), commonly known as Danielli or Dani, is a female Brazilian football midfielder.

She was part of the Brazil women's national football team at the 2012 Summer Olympics. She was called up two days before the start of the tournament when magnetic resonance imaging revealed that Elaine Estrela Moura had a muscle injury.

In 2013, on club level she played for São José.

In 2016, Danielli played four matches for Santos in the Campeonato Brasileiro de Futebol Feminino. She left Santos for São Paulo FC ahead of the 2020 season.

See also
 Brazil at the 2012 Summer Olympics

References

External links
http://www.soccerpunter.com/players/253649-Danielli-Pereira-da-Silva
http://www.betstudy.com/soccer-stats/player/253649/danielli-pereira-da-silva/
http://www.rsssfbrasil.com/sel/brazil200215u20w.htm
Profile at Santos FC 

1987 births
Living people
Brazilian women's footballers
Brazil women's international footballers
Place of birth missing (living people)
Footballers at the 2012 Summer Olympics
Olympic footballers of Brazil
Women's association football midfielders
Esporte Clube São José players
Santos FC (women) players
Kubanochka Krasnodar players
Expatriate women's footballers in Russia
Brazilian expatriate footballers
Brazilian expatriate sportspeople in Russia
São Paulo FC (women) players